Maltese Americans (Maltese: Maltin Amerikani or Maltin tal-Amerika) are Americans with Maltese ancestry.

History

The first immigrants from Malta to the United States arrived during the mid-eighteenth century to the city of New Orleans, Louisiana.  Many Americans assumed Malta was part of Italy.  In some cases "Born Malta, Italy" was put on tombstones of Maltese because of the confusion.

At this time and in the nineteenth century the Maltese who emigrated to the United States were still scarce.  In fact, in the 1860s, only between five and ten Maltese emigrated to the United States every year. The majority of them were agricultural workers, and, in the case of New Orleans, market gardeners and vegetable dealers.

20th century 
After World War I, in 1919, Maltese immigration to the US increased. In the first quarter of 1920 more than 1,300 Maltese immigrated to the United States. Detroit, Michigan, with jobs in the expanding automobile industry, drew the largest share of immigrants. It is believed that in the following years, more than 15,000 Maltese people emigrated to the United States, later getting U.S. citizenship.

A significant percentage of early Maltese immigrants intended to stay only temporarily for work, but many settled in the US permanently.  In addition to Detroit, other industrial cities such as New York City, San Francisco, and Chicago attracted Maltese immigrants.

After World War II the Maltese government committed to pay passage costs to Maltese people who wanted to emigrate and live at least two years abroad. This program led to increased emigration by the people of the island and made up approximately 8,000 Maltese who arrived to the United States between the years 1947 and 1977. Malta's government promoted Maltese emigration because Malta was overpopulated.

Demography 
Estimates of the number of Maltese immigrants and their descendants living in the US by 1990 have been as high as 70,000. The majority of Americans of Maltese descent continued to live in the same cities where immigration had taken place, particularly Detroit (approximately 44,000 Maltese) and New York City (more than 20,000 Maltese); in the latter, most of the people of Maltese origin are concentrated in Astoria, Queens. San Francisco and Chicago also have significant populations.

The 2019 American Community Survey estimated that there were 42,058 Americans of Maltese ancestry living in the United States. Of these, 14,078 have Maltese as their only ancestry. This includes Maltese born immigrants to the United States, their American born descendants as well as numerous immigrants from other nations of Maltese origin. Around 6,506 of them are foreign born.

Religion 
As in their country of origin, Maltese Americans predominantly practice Roman Catholicism as their religion. Many are practicing Catholics, attending church every week and actively participating in their local parishes.

Notable people 
 Rosemarie Aquilina, judge
 Kyle Balda, animator and film director
 Joseph Borg, financial regulator
 Joseph Anthony Buttigieg II, literary scholar and translator
 Pete Buttigieg, Former mayor of South Bend, Indiana, 2020 presidential candidate, US Secretary of Transportation
 Joseph Calleia, actor and singer
 Orlando E. Caruana
Darrin Q. Camilleri, member of the Michigan House of Representatives
 Alex DeBrincat, hockey player
 Aaron Falzon, basketball player
 Tevin Falzon, basketball player
 Danielle Fishel
 Nazzareno Formosa
 Joseph Lapira
 Joe Sacco
 Britney Spears
 Bryan Spears
 Jamie Lynn Spears
 Lynne Spears
 Charlie Williams

See also

 Hyphenated American

References

Further reading
 Andreassi, Diane. "Maltese Americans." Gale Encyclopedia of Multicultural America, edited by Thomas Riggs, (3rd ed., vol. 3, Gale, 2014), pp. 163–170. online
 Andreassi, Diane. Maltese in Detroit (Arcadia, 2011).
 Cassar, Paul. Early Relations between Malta and the United States of America (Valletta, Malta: Midsea Books, 1976).
 Lubig, Joseph M. Maltese in Michigan (Michigan State University Press, 2011).

External links
  Maltese American Benevolent Society in Detroit

European-American society